The 2011 Judo World Masters World Masters was held in Baku, Azerbaijan, from 15 to 16 January 2011.

Medal summary

Medal table
 Host nation

Men's events

Women's events

References

External links
 

IJF World Masters
World Masters
World Masters
Judo
Masters 2011
Judo